The Nerva–Antonine dynasty comprised seven Roman emperors who ruled from 96 to 192 AD: Nerva (96–98), Trajan (98–117), Hadrian (117–138), Antoninus Pius (138–161), Marcus Aurelius (161–180), Lucius Verus (161–169), and Commodus (180–192). The first five of these are commonly known as the "Five Good Emperors".

The first five of the six successions within this dynasty were notable in that the reigning Emperor did not have a male heir, and had to adopt the candidate of his choice to be his successor. Under Roman law, an adoption established a bond legally as strong as that of kinship. Because of this, all but the first and last of the Nerva–Antonine emperors are called Adoptive Emperors.

The importance of official adoption in Roman society has often been considered a conscious repudiation of the principle of dynastic inheritance and has been deemed one of the factors of the period's prosperity. However, this was not a new practice. It was common for patrician families to adopt, and Roman emperors had adopted heirs in the past: the Emperor Augustus had adopted Tiberius, and the Emperor Claudius had adopted Nero. Julius Caesar, dictator perpetuo and considered to be instrumental in the transition from Republic to Empire, adopted Gaius Octavius, who later became Augustus, Rome's first emperor. Moreover, there were often still family connections: Trajan adopted his first cousin once removed and great-nephew by marriage Hadrian, Hadrian made his half-nephew by marriage Antoninus Pius heir, and the latter adopted both Hadrian's half-great-nephew by marriage Marcus Aurelius (Antonius' nephew by marriage) and the son of Hadrian's original planned successor, Lucius Verus. Marcus Aurelius's naming of his son Commodus as heir was considered to be an unfortunate choice and the beginning of the Empire's decline.

With the murder of Commodus in 192, the Nerva–Antonine dynasty came to an end; it was followed by a period of turbulence known as the Year of the Five Emperors.

History

Nerva–Trajan dynasty 
Nerva was the first of the dynasty. Though his reign was short, it saw a partial reconciliation between the army, the senate and the commoners. Nerva adopted as his son the popular military leader Trajan. In turn, Hadrian succeeded Trajan; he had been the latter's heir presumptive, and averred that he had been adopted by him on Trajan's deathbed.

Antonine dynasty 
The Antonines are four Roman Emperors who ruled between 138 and 192: Antoninus Pius, Marcus Aurelius, Lucius Verus and Commodus.

In 138, after a long reign dedicated to the cultural unification and consolidation of the empire, the Emperor Hadrian named Antoninus Pius his son and heir, under the condition that he adopt both Marcus Aurelius and Lucius Verus. Hadrian died that same year, and Antoninus began a peaceful, benevolent reign. He adhered strictly to Roman traditions and institutions, and shared his power with the Roman Senate.

Marcus Aurelius and Lucius Verus succeeded Antoninus Pius in 161 upon that emperor's death, and co-ruled until Verus' death in 169. Marcus continued the Antonine legacy after Verus' death as an unpretentious and gifted administrator and leader. He died in 180 and was followed by his biological son, Commodus.

Five Good Emperors 
The rulers commonly known as the "Five Good Emperors" were Nerva, Trajan, Hadrian, Antoninus Pius, and Marcus Aurelius. The term was coined by Niccolò Machiavelli in his posthumously published book The Discourses on Livy from 1531:

Machiavelli argued that these adopted emperors earned the respect of those around them through good governing:

Edward Gibbon wrote in The History of the Decline and Fall of the Roman Empire that their rule was a time when "the Roman Empire was governed by absolute power, under the guidance of wisdom and virtue". Gibbon believed that these benevolent monarchs and their moderate policies were unusual and contrasted with their more tyrannical and oppressive successors.

Alternative hypothesis 
One hypothesis posits that adoptive succession arose because of a lack of biological heirs. All but the last of the adoptive emperors had no legitimate biological sons to succeed them. They were therefore obliged to pick a successor somewhere else; as soon as the Emperor could look towards a biological son to succeed him, adoptive succession was set aside.

The dynasty may be broken up into the Nerva–Trajan dynasty (also called the Ulpian dynasty after Trajan's gentile name 'Ulpius') and Antonine dynasty (after their common name Antoninus).

 Note: Marcus Aurelius co-reigned with Lucius Verus from 161 until Verus' death in 169.

References 

 
Roman imperial dynasties
96 establishments
192 disestablishments
90s establishments in the Roman Empire
2nd-century disestablishments in the Roman Empire